is a railway station on the Kagoshima Main Line, operated by Kyushu Railway Company in Minami-ku, Kumamoto, Japan.

The station opened on March 12, 2011. The name of the station was officially announced by JR Kyushu on December 17, 2010.

References 

Railway stations in Kumamoto Prefecture
Railway stations in Japan opened in 2011